Klement-Mile Alujević-Španjol (14 October 1920 – 15 January 1984) was a Croatian rower. He competed in the men's coxless four event at the 1948 Summer Olympics.

References

External links
 

1920 births
1984 deaths
Croatian male rowers
Olympic rowers of Yugoslavia
Rowers at the 1948 Summer Olympics
Rowers from Split, Croatia
Burials at Lovrinac Cemetery